Vladimir 'Vlado' Kasalo (born 11 November 1962) is a Croatian retired footballer who played as a central defender.

Club career
After representing NK Osijek and Dinamo Zagreb in his country, Kasalo was sold by the latter to Germany's 1. FC Nürnberg, for 1 million Deutsche Mark. In his second season, he infamously scored two consecutive own goals in as many matches: on  16 March 1991, at VfB Stuttgart (0–1) and on 23 March, against Karlsruher SC (0–2). He was suspected to have done that on purpose to pay off his gambling debts, although it was never proven.

Kasalo retired in the same country at only 31, with second division's 1. FSV Mainz 05.

International career
His only cap for Yugoslavia came in a friendly against the Soviet Union, on 29 August 1987. He added two for newly formed Croatia, in the 1990 friendly games against the United States, the nation's first, and Romania. Both unofficial, since Croatia was still part of Yugoslavia at the time.

References

External links

1962 births
Living people
Association football defenders
Yugoslav footballers
Yugoslavia international footballers
Croatian footballers
Croatia international footballers
Dual internationalists (football)
NK Osijek players
GNK Dinamo Zagreb players
1. FC Nürnberg players
1. FSV Mainz 05 players
Yugoslav First League players
Bundesliga players
2. Bundesliga players
Yugoslav expatriate footballers
Croatian expatriate footballers
Expatriate footballers in Germany
Yugoslav expatriate sportspeople in Germany
Croatian expatriate sportspeople in Germany